A fraternity is an organisation of men.

Fraternity may also refer to:

Associations
 Benefit society
 Chivalric order
 Fraternal order
 Friendly society
 Honor society, an organization which recognizes achievement
 Religious order
 Secret society
 Social club
 Trade union

Academic and student fraternities

Europe
 Corporation (university), college fraternity; for example German Student Corps
 Nation (university), student organization
 Studentenverbindung, student organizations in Germany
 Student society
 Students' union

North America
 College fraternities and sororities, also called Greek letter organizations or social fraternities, initiatory organizations which unite students through the undergraduate college course 
 Collegiate secret societies in North America, organizations in which membership is limited by year of study
 Literary society, an organization formed as a student-directed supplement to the academic curriculum
 Professional fraternities and sororities, organizations which promote fellowship among those in a particular academic discipline or career field
 Service fraternities and sororities, organizations whose primary purpose is community service

Sociology
 Fraternity (philosophy), a type of relationship between people

Other uses
 Fraternity (band), an Australian rock group from the early 1970s, featuring AC/DC's Bon Scott
 Fraternity Records, a record label

See also
 List of general fraternities
 List of social fraternities and sororities
 North American fraternity and sorority housing, large group housing for members of a fraternity or sorority
 Brotherhood (disambiguation)